Caritas Communications Limited is a public relations firm headquartered in the Nigeria's commercial city of Lagos and Abuja . Its major clients are in the energy, oil and gas sector. The agency has three subsidiaries which include Caritas PR, Caritas Communications and Caritas Digital, controlled by the parent company, First Caritas Investments Limited

In 2016, a United Kingdom-based Corporate Vision (CV) Magazine named Caritas Communications the best "Reputation Management Consulting Firm" at the ACE 2016 African Corporate Excellence Awards. In 2019 Caritas Communications CEO Adedayo Ojo announced that the firm was leading Nigeria to join Navigate Response, a global crisis communications network that covers key maritime hotspots in West Africa and the Mediterranean.

History 
Caritas Communications was established in 1999 by Adedayo Ojo, but did not start operation until 2009 when it fully launched for operation. Caritas has offices in Nigeria and Ghana.

Caritas first clients are in the energy sector and later expanded networks to telecommunications, public and financial sectors as well as consumer products companies. In 2017, Caritas Communications led a crisis management campaign for ExxonMobil engulfed in an industrial dispute with its employees that threatened to shut down oil production in Nigeria's oil rich region of Niger Delta.

In August 2014, Caritas Digital, a subsidiary of Caritas Communications signed a “strategic partnership agreement” with Investis Limited, a software-as-a-service provider, to deploy digital corporate communication solutions to companies in West Africa.

Caritas in 2018 in partnership with Nigeria Institute of Public Relations, (NIPR) launched its maiden edition of Caritas Reputation Leadership Roundtable Summit in Lagos with focus on “Ethics, Reputation & Technology in a VUCA Economy”.

Caritas Communications is a member of Association of Advertising Agencies of Nigeria (AAAN). It is also a member of Public Relations Consultant Association of Nigeria (PRCAN) as well as Nigerian-British Chamber of Commerce.

Awards 
 Best for Reputation Management Award 2016 awarded by Corporate Vision (CV) Magazine, United Kingdom.
 Corporate Practitioner of Excellence Award, 2019 awarded by Nigeria Institute of Public Relation (NIPR).

References

External links 
 Official website

Mass media companies of Nigeria
Articles with LCCN identifiers
Mass media companies established in 2009
Nigerian companies established in 2009
Marketing companies of Nigeria
Companies based in Lagos